Jonathan Williams (born February 2, 1994) is an American football running back for the Washington Commanders of the National Football League (NFL). He played college football at Arkansas and was drafted by the Buffalo Bills in the fifth round of the 2016 NFL Draft. Williams has also been a member of the New Orleans Saints, Denver Broncos, Indianapolis Colts, and Detroit Lions.

High school
A native of Allen, Texas, he attended Allen High School, where he collected more than 3,500 rushing yards in his career and scored 39 total touchdowns.

Considered a four-star recruit by Rivals.com, he was rated as the 17th best running back prospect of his class, and drew comparisons to former Atlanta Falcons running back Michael Turner. On November 16, 2011, he committed to play college football at Arkansas, after he had previously been committed to Missouri.

College career

As a true freshman in 2012, he played in 11 games, and made two starts. He recorded 45 rushes for 231 yards and eight receptions for 208 yards and two touchdowns. He scored his first career touchdown on a 74-yard pass, his first reception of his career, on the first offensive play of the game against Kentucky. As a sophomore in 2013, he played in all 12 games, making 11 starts. He recorded 150 carries for 900 yards, scoring four touchdowns while adding seven receptions for 72 yards and two touchdowns. Teaming with true freshman Alex Collins, they produced Arkansas’ second pair of teammates to each rush for at least 900 yards in the same season. Darren McFadden and Felix Jones were the only previous tandem to do so, achieving the accomplishment in the 2006 and 2007 seasons. In 2014, despite splitting carries with Collins, he rushed for 1,190 yards on 211 carries (5.6 avg) and 12 touchdowns.

On December 24, 2014, Williams announced on YouTube in a message to Razorback fans that he would be returning for his senior season at Arkansas. During summer camp leading into the 2015 season, Williams suffered a foot injury that would force him to miss the entire upcoming regular season.

Professional career

Buffalo Bills

The Buffalo Bills selected Williams in the fifth round (156th overall) of the 2016 NFL Draft. On May 13, 2016, he signed a four-year contract with the Bills.

On September 3, 2017, Williams was released by the Bills.

Denver Broncos
On September 5, 2017, Williams was signed to the Denver Broncos' practice squad.

New Orleans Saints
On November 14, 2017, Williams was signed to a two-year deal by the New Orleans Saints off the Broncos' practice squad.

On September 1, 2018, Williams was waived by the Saints and was signed to the practice squad the next day. He was promoted to the active roster on September 8, 2018. He was waived on September 28, 2018.

Indianapolis Colts
On October 2, 2018, Williams was signed to the Indianapolis Colts' practice squad. He was promoted to the active roster on November 20, 2018.

In Week 11 of the 2019 season against the Jacksonville Jaguars, Williams rushed 13 times for 116 yards in the 33–13 win. The following week, Williams ran for 104 yards and a score against the Houston Texans on Thursday Night Football. Williams appeared in nine games and recorded 49 carries for 235 rushing yards and one rushing touchdown on the 2019 season.

Detroit Lions 
Williams was signed by the Detroit Lions on August 17, 2020. He was released on September 5, 2020, and signed to the practice squad the next day. He was elevated to the active roster on September 12 for the team's Week 1 game against the Chicago Bears and reverted to the practice squad on September 14. He was released on September 22.

Washington Football Team
On October 7, 2020, Williams was signed to the Washington Football Team's practice squad.

Detroit Lions (second stint)
Williams was signed off Washington's practice squad by the Lions on October 30, 2020. He fumbled on his only carry as a Lion. Williams was waived on December 24, 2020.

Washington Football Team (second stint)

Williams re-signed to Washington's practice squad on December 31, 2020. On January 11, 2021, Williams signed a reserve/futures contract with Washington. He was released on August 31, 2021, but re-signed to their practice squad on September 6, 2021. He was released on November 2.

New York Giants
On November 17, 2021, Williams was signed to the New York Giants practice squad.

Washington Football Team / Commanders (third stint)
On December 8, 2021, Williams was signed off the Giants' practice squad by Washington. He scored a rushing touchdown in a Week 14 game against the Dallas Cowboys. Williams re-signed with Washington on January 11, 2022.

Williams re-signed on another one-year contract on February 24, 2023.

References

External links
Washington Commanders bio
Arkansas Razorbacks bio

Living people
1994 births
Players of American football from Texas
Sportspeople from the Dallas–Fort Worth metroplex
People from Allen, Texas
American football running backs
Arkansas Razorbacks football players
Buffalo Bills players
Denver Broncos players
New Orleans Saints players
Indianapolis Colts players
Detroit Lions players
Washington Commanders players
Washington Football Team players
New York Giants players